Anatema: Legenda o prekliati is a 1995 adventure video game developed by Rune Software and published by Riki Computer Games for DOS.

Gameplay
Anatema is a first person adventure game visually resembling Wolfenstein 3D. Player has to escape from Emare castle where he was captured by evil ghost.

References 

1995 video games
Adventure games
DOS games
DOS-only games
Riki Computer Games games
Single-player video games
Video games about ghosts
Video games developed in Slovakia
Video games set in castles